Born to Exile is a fantasy novel by American writer Phyllis Eisenstein, the first of her three Alaric novels. It was originally published in 1978 by longtime U. S. specialty press Arkham House in a first edition trade hardcover of 4,148 copies; it has since been published in several mass-market paperback editions and again in hardcover in the UK. Portions of the novel were first serialized as individual shorter works through The Magazine of Fantasy & Science Fiction. (The second novel in the series, In The Red Lord's Reach, was first published in 1989 as a mass-market paperback from Signet Books and as a 1992 UK hardcover from Grafton, having been first serialized in 1988 as three monthly installments in The Magazine of Fantasy and Science Fiction.)

Plot summary

Born to Exile concerns the adventures of a wandering minstrel called Alaric, who possesses the otherwise unknown ability to teleport. The novel details his journey to uncover the secrets of his own past and the true nature of his mysterious ability.

For eight weary months, Alaric the minstrel trudged the lonely road of exile. Born with preternatural powers, the infant Alaric had been found by foster parents abandoned on a hillside, newborn and naked, with a bloody, severed hand clutching his ankles. Older and with those powers on full display, he suddenly found himself rejected by his foster family, branded a witch-child. Alaric now wanders the world as a solitary wayfarer, with a knapsack, a few clothes, and a lute his only possessions.

On this journey, he encounters the craggy towers and shining spires of a distant castle, like some gleaming vision in one of his songs. Within, Alaric is accepted as court minstrel but becomes embroiled in palace intrigue that involves Medron, the court magician, and the King's daughter, Princess Solinde. Subsequently, he journeys to the sinister Inn of the Black Swan and then to a superstition-ensorcelled village. There, Alaric is restored to his supernatural antecedents, known as the Lords of All Power.

Sources

External links
 

1978 American novels
American science fiction novels
American fantasy novels
Novels by Phyllis Eisenstein
Works originally published in The Magazine of Fantasy & Science Fiction
Arkham House books